The following outline is provided as an overview of and topical guide to geology:

Geology – one of the Earth sciences – is the study of the Earth, with the general exclusion of present-day life, flow within the ocean, and the atmosphere. The field of geology encompasses the composition, structure, physical properties, and history of Earth's components, and the processes by which it is shaped. Geologists typically study rock, sediment, soil, rivers, and natural resources.

Branches of geology 
Geology applies primarily to Earth, but can be applied to any planet or extraterrestrial body.

Geology of Earth 
Subdisciplines of geology:

Planetary geology 
See also:

Principles of geology

Geological processes

History of geology

Geologic provinces 

Geologic provinces based on origin:
 
 
 
 
 
 
 
 
 
 
 Extended

Plate tectonics

Occupations in geology 
The Dictionary of Occupational Titles lists the following occupations in Geology, which it describes as "concerned with the investigation of the composition, structure, and physical and biological history of the earth's crust and the application of this knowledge in such fields as archeology, mining, construction, and environmental impact":

 
 
 
 
 
 
 
 
 
 
 
 
 Volcanologist
 Engineer, Soils
 Geophysical-Laboratory Chief (Alternate Titles: Director, Geophysical)
 Geological Aide (Petrol. & Gas)
 
 
 Laboratory Assistant (Petrol. & Gas) (Alternate Titles: Analyst, Geochemical Prospecting; Core Analyst; Laboratory Tester)

Influential geologists

Geology lists

See also 

 

 American Geophysical Union
 American Geosciences Institute
 European Geosciences Union
 Geological Society of America
 Geological Society of London

References

External links
 A. Balasubramanian, First edition, July, 2017
 Earth Science News, Maps, Dictionary, Articles, Jobs
 Video-interviews with famous geologists
 "Geology, Importance, Branches, Career in Geology, Indian Education System for a career in Geology
Geology Buzz: Branches of Geology

Geology
Geology